Feng Wang is an American physicist, currently at University of California, Berkeley and an Elected Fellow of the American Physical Society.

Education
Wang received a B.A. from Fudan University, Shanghai, in 1999 and a Ph.D. from Columbia University in 2004.

References

Year of birth missing (living people)
Living people
Fellows of the American Physical Society
University of California, Berkeley College of Letters and Science faculty
21st-century American physicists
Columbia University alumni
Fudan University alumni